Tash Aw, whose full name is Aw Ta-Shi (born 4 October 1971) is a Malaysian writer living in London.

Biography 
Born in 1971 in Taipei, Taiwan, to Malaysian parents, Tash Aw returned to Kuala Lumpur, Malaysia, at the age of two, and grew up there. Like many Malaysians, he had a multilingual upbringing, speaking Chinese and Cantonese at home, and Malay and English at school. He eventually relocated to England to study law at Jesus College, Cambridge, and at the University of Warwick before moving to London to write. He completed the MA in creative writing at the University of East Anglia in 2003.

His first novel, The Harmony Silk Factory, was published in 2005. It was longlisted for the 2005 Man Booker Prize and won the 2005 Whitbread Book Awards First Novel Award as well as the 2005 Commonwealth Writers Prize for Best First Novel (Asia Pacific region). It also made it to the long-list of the world's prestigious 2007 International Impac Dublin Award and the Guardian First Book Prize. It has thus far been translated into twenty languages. Aw cites his literary influences as James Baldwin, Toni Morrison, Marguerite Duras, William Faulkner and Albert Camus.

His second novel, titled Map of the Invisible World, was published in May 2009. Time magazine called it "a complex, gripping drama of private relationships," and praised "Aw's matchless descriptive prose", "immense intelligence and empathy."  His 2013 novel Five Star Billionaire was longlisted for the 2013 Man Booker Prize. In 2016, he published The Face: Strangers on a Pier, a memoir on immigration through the experience of his Chinese-Malaysian family, which was a finalist for the Los Angeles Times Book Prize. His novel, We, The Survivors, published in 2019, was also a finalist for the Los Angeles Times Book Prize. His novels have been translated into 23 languages.

Miscellaneous 
Based on royalties as well as prizes, Aw is the most successful Malaysian writer of recent years. Following the announcement of the Booker longlist, the Whitbread Award and his Commonwealth Writers' Prize award, he became a celebrity in Malaysia and Singapore.

He was a juror for the 2014 O. Henry Award, identifying Mark Haddon's "The Gun" as his favourite story of the year's selection.

In January 2018, his alma mater, the University of Warwick, awarded him an honorary Doctor of Letters degree.

He has been a visiting professor at Columbia University and was the 2018/19 Judith Ginsberg Fellow at the Institute of Ideas & Imagination in Paris.

Works

Novels
 The Harmony Silk Factory (2005)
 Map of the Invisible World (2009)
 Five Star Billionaire (2013)
 We, The Survivors (2019)

Short Stories
 "Notes from a Desert Sketchbook", Off the Edge, Issue 07 (2005) - Off the Edge was a Malaysian English-language magazine, now defunct
 "The American Brick Problem", Prospect, Issue 122 (May 2006)
 "To The City", Granta, 100 (Winter 2007)
 "Sail", A Public Space, Issue 13 (Summer 2011) - won the 2013 O. Henry Prize; republished in The O. Henry Prize Stories 2013, Laura Furman (ed.)
 "Tian Huaiyi", McSweeney's 42 (December 2012)
 "Tiger" (January 2013)

Nonfiction
The Face: Strangers On A Pier (2016)

Essays
 "Look East, Look To The Future", Granta.com, 25 May 2012
 "My Hero, Rudy Hartono", The Guardian, 9 August 2013
 "You Need To Look Away: Visions of Contemporary Malaysia", The Weeklings, 4 April 2014
 "Heart and Soul in Every Stitch", Granta.com, 16 April 2014
 "A Stranger at the Family Table", NewYorker.com, 11 February 2016
 "Bridge to Nowhere", The Fabulist, Issue 16
 "Burgess and the Malay Novels", Burgess at 100, Episode 2
 "Living and Writing as a Divided Southeast-Asian: On Privilege, Unfairness, and Wanting More From Life", Literary Hub, 10 September 2019
 Collected Op-Ed Articles from The New York Times, nytimes.com, 2014-

As editor
 X-24: Unclassified (2007) (co-editor with Nii Parkes)

References

External links
 Official website
  The Guardian, interview 2019
  We, the Survivors, The Guardian, 2019, review by John Burnside
  We, the Survivors, Times Literary Supplement, 2019, review by Francesca Wade
 The first chapter of The Harmony Silk Factory in PDF file
  Biography from the international literature festival berlin
 Cover Story: Tash for Cash in TheEdgeDaily.com
 Whitbread Book Awards
 The man behind the author, an interview on a Malaysian website
 2013 interview in The New York Times
 Staying true to his beliefs 
  Electric Lit, interview with YZ Chin, 2019
  The Believer Magazine, in conversation with Chia-Chia Lin, 2019

1971 births
Living people
Malaysian novelists
Malaysian writers
Malaysian male writers
Costa Book Award winners
Alumni of Jesus College, Cambridge
Alumni of the University of Warwick
Alumni of the University of East Anglia
English people of Chinese descent
Malaysian people of Chinese descent
Malaysian emigrants to the United Kingdom
People from Kuala Lumpur
Writers from Taipei
Writers from London
21st-century Malaysian people
21st-century novelists
21st-century male writers